Team BikeExchange can refer to:

 Team BikeExchange (men's team)
 2021 Team BikeExchange (men's team) season
 Team BikeExchange (women's team)